Nicolás Vivaldo (1896 – 1990) was an Argentine footballer, who played for Racing, Porteño, and Argentinos Juniors between 1913 and 1925. He was part of the "golden age" of Racing Club that earned the club the nickname Academy. Vivaldo won 17 titles with Racing.

Internationally, he played in ten matches for the Argentina national football team from 1917 to 1925. He was also part of Argentina's squad for the 1917 South American Championship.

Titles
Racing
 Primera División (8): 1913, 1914, 1915, 1916, 1917, 1918 
 Copa Honor MCBA (3): 1913, 1915, 1917
 Copa Ibarguren (5): 1913, 1914, 1916, 1917, 1918
 Copa de Honor Cousenier (1): 1913 
 Copa Aldao (2): 1917, 1918

References

1896 births
1990 deaths
Argentine footballers
Argentina international footballers
Place of birth missing
Association football forwards